Friheten ("The Freedom") was a Norwegian newspaper, published in Nordland county.

Friheten was started on 6 December 1923 as the Communist Party organ in the county. It was published weekly; from 1925 twice a week. However, the party struggled economically and the newspaper went defunct after its last issue on 6 December 1928.

Editor-in-chief from 1923 to 1927 was Alfred B. Skar.

References

1923 establishments in Norway
1924 disestablishments in Norway
Communist Party of Norway newspapers
Defunct newspapers published in Norway
Mass media in Nordland
Norwegian-language newspapers
Newspapers established in 1923
Publications disestablished in 1924